Judenfrei ("free of Jews") and judenrein ("clean of Jews") are terms of Nazi origin to designate an area that has been "cleansed" of Jews during The Holocaust. 
While judenfrei refers merely to "freeing" an area of all of its Jewish inhabitants, the term judenrein (literally "clean of Jews") has the even stronger connotation that any trace of Jewish blood had been removed as an alleged impurity in the minds of the criminal perpetrators. These terms of racial discrimination and racial abuse are intrinsic to Nazi anti-Semitism and were used by the Nazis in Germany before World War II and in occupied countries such as Poland in 1939. Judenfrei describes the local Jewish population having been removed from a town, region, or country by forced evacuation during the Holocaust, though many Jews were hidden by local people. Removal methods included forced re-housing in Nazi ghettos especially in eastern Europe, and forced removal or Resettlement to the East by German troops, often to their deaths. Most Jews were identified from late 1941 by the yellow badge as a result of pressure from Joseph Goebbels and Heinrich Himmler.

Following the defeat of Germany in 1945, some attempts have been made to attract Jewish people back to Germany, as well as reconstruct synagogues destroyed during and after Kristallnacht. The terms judenrein and judenfrei have since been used in the persecution of global Jewish communities or the nation of Israel.

Locations declared judenfrei
Establishments, villages, cities, and regions were declared judenfrei or judenrein after they were apparently cleared of Jews. However, some Jewish people survived by being hidden and sheltered by friendly neighbours. In Berlin, they were known as "submariners" since they seemed to have disappeared (under the waves). Many survived the end of the war, hence becoming Holocaust survivors.

Gelnhausen, Germany and Calw, Germany – reported judenfrei on November 1, 1938, by propaganda newspaper Kinzigwacht after their synagogues were closed and remaining local Jews forced to leave the towns.
 German-occupied Bydgoszcz (Poland) – reported judenfrei in December 1939.
 German-annexed Alsace – reported judenrein by Robert Heinrich Wagner in July 1940.
 Banat, German-occupied territory of Serbia – reported judenfrei on 19 August 1941 in Völkische Beobachter (lit. People's Observer). On 20 August 1941 Banat was declared judenfrei by its German administrators.
 German-occupied Luxembourg – reported judenfrei by the press on October 17, 1941.
 German-occupied Estonia – December 1941. Reported as judenfrei at the Wannsee Conference on January 20, 1942.
 Independent State of Croatia – Declared judenfrei by Interior Minister Andrija Artuković in February 1942 but Germany suspected that this was not true and the authorities from Berlin sent Franz Abromeit to assess the situation. After that, the Ustaše were under pressure to finish the job. In April 1942 two hundred Jews from Osijek were deported to Jasenovac, while 2,800 were sent to Auschwitz. The Gestapo organized the deportation to Auschwitz of the last Croatian Jews in May 1943, 1,700 from Zagreb and 2,500 from other parts of the NDH. German diplomat Siegfried Kasche  pronounced Croatia judenfrei in a message to Berlin on 18 April 1944, stating that "Croatia is one of the countries in which the Jewish problem has been solved".
 German-occupied territory of Serbia / Belgrade – May 1942, reported in the SS-Standartenführer Emanuel Schäfer cable sent to the Reich Security Main Office in Berlin; Schäfer was the Der Befehlshaber der SIPO und des SD head at that time in Belgrade, while in June 1942 he reported to his supervisors that "Serbien ist Judenfrei" (lit. "Serbia is free of Jews"). In August 1942, Harald Turner reported to the German commander in the Balkans that Serbia was the first European territory where the "Jewish problem" was solved.
 Vienna – reported judenfrei by Alois Brunner on October 9, 1942.
 Berlin, Germany – May 19, 1943.
 Erlangen, Germany was declared judenfrei in 1944.

Modern usage

Israeli–Palestinian conflict 
In the Israeli–Palestinian conflict, a fear among many Israelis which has been reflected by Israeli government officials such as Benjamin Netanyahu is that the proposed removal of Israeli Jewish settlements in the West Bank according to the wishes of Palestinian officials is tantamount to rendering these areas judenrein, or clean of Jews.

On July 9, 2009, Benjamin Netanyahu, in a discussion with the German foreign minister Frank-Walter Steinmeier is reported to have said, using the Israeli term for the area, "Judea and Samaria cannot be judenrein, commenting on the Palestinian demand to remove the Israeli settlements in the West Bank."

Islamic world

The depopulation of the Jewish communities from Arab and Muslim countries of the Middle East and North Africa was described as the result of an effort to make these countries judenrein or judenfrei. Dr. Peter Schotten wrote on the matter, saying "Arab states responded ruthlessly to the lost war and to the newly displaced Arab refugees by undertaking systematic and bold oppressive measures against their Jewish citizens. Their citizenship was stripped, arrests and detentions took place, religious restrictions were imposed, freedom of movement was curtailed, assets were frozen and property seized, employment opportunities were closed off and Zionism was criminalized." Lyn Julius wrote in the Jewish Journal, "Only three years after the end of World War II, the members of the Arab League were bent on emulating the Nazis. They set about making the Arab Middle East judenrein (free of Jews). They applied Nuremberg-style laws, criminalizing Zionism, freezing Jewish bank accounts, instituting quotas, imposing restrictions on jobs and movement. The result was the mass exodus and spoliation of a million Jews."

Saudi Arabia, Jordan, Syria, Kuwait, Oman, Libya, Sudan, and Malaysia are believed to have no remaining Jewish population. 

Afghanistan is believed to have no Jewish population left, after the last two known remaining Jews, Zablon Simintov and his cousin Tova Moradi left in September and October 2021. Before the 2021 Taliban resurgence, Zablon ran the only synagogue in all of Afghanistan in the capital of Kabul, where he maintained and took care of it.

Asmara, Eritrea, is believed to have a single native Jewish resident left: Sami Cohen, who runs an import-export business and attends to the Asmara Synagogue.

On July 13, 2020, it was reported that the last Jews in Yemen are captives of the Houthi militia of the Kharif District. In March 2021, The Jerusalem Post reported that the remaining Jewish population in Yemen consists of four people. In March 2022 the UN reports there is just 1 Jew left in Yemen

In Egypt, it is estimated the country has 3 known Jews remaining as of 2021.

In Iraq, it is estimated the country has 3-4 known Jews remaining as of 2021

Turkey (15,000 in 2021), Iran (8,500 in 2021), Morocco (2,100 in 2021), Tunisia (1,000 in 2021), Armenia (300-500), Algeria (200 in 2021), Ethiopia (100 in 2021), and Lebanon (29 in 2021) have also seen huge declines in Jewish population. Officially, there are no Jews in Kurdistan; however, the sending of Hanukkah kits to Jews to Arab countries and regions, including Kurdistan, indicate there may be Jewish remnants there.

See also
Armenia without Armenians
History of the Jews in Germany
LGBT-free zone

References 

Nazi terminology
Demographics
Jews and Judaism in Europe
Holocaust terminology
Expulsions of Jews